Aliyari is a surname. Notable people with the surname include:

Mehdi Aliyari (born 1989), Iranian sport wrestler
Reza Aliyari (born 1994), Iranian footballer

Surnames of Iranian origin